Belvedere Heights, Los Angeles may mean: 
 Belvedere Heights, East Los Angeles, early 20th-century subdivision near in what is now northwestern East Los Angeles, California
 Belvedere Heights, early 20th-century subdivision near W. 21st St. and Western Av. in the Jefferson Park and Adams-Normandie neighborhoods of southwestern part of the City Los Angeles
 Belvedere Heights, a fictitious Chicano neighborhood of Los Angeles in the TV series Penny Dreadful: City of Angels